CF Montréal Academy (formerly Montreal Impact Academy) is a soccer academy based in Montreal, Quebec, Canada. They are the academy of Major League Soccer club CF Montréal. Founded in 2010, they operated a team in the Canadian Soccer League from 2010 to 2012. Their U-23 team played in the USL Premier Development League in 2014.

History
The club was founded in 2010 by the original Montreal Impact after Trois-Rivières Attak decided to take a sabbatical for the 2010 season. Attak owner Tony Iannitto waived his players rights and opened his territory for the benefit of the Impact Academy. Montreal repatriated all the players and coaching staff from Trois-Rivieres to form the Academy while the Attak decided to sit out the 2010 season for undisclosed reasons. Head Coach Philippe Eullaffroy recruited several promising players like Karl Ouimette, Maxim Tissot, Maxime Crépeau, Alessandro Riggi, Valentin Radevich, Kevin Cossette, Kevin Luarca, Mircea Ilcu, and Anthony Jackson-Hamel. Saputo Stadium served as their first home venue. 

The club made its debut on May 15, 2010 in a match against Milltown F.C. which ended in a 0-0 draw. In their debut season in the CSL, Montreal finished ninth in the standings missing the final postseason berth by two points. For the 2011 season notable academy graduates were Wandrille Lefèvre, Zakaria Messoudi, Victor N'Diaye, Philippe Lincourt-Joseph, and Jonathan Vallée. In their second season Montreal clinch their first postseason berth by finishing sixth in the standings, and finished with the fourth best offensive record within the league. Their opponents in the quarterfinals were Capital City F.C., where in the first match the Impact tied Ottawa to a 1-1 draw with a goal from Lefèvre. In the second leg of the series Montreal suffered a 2-1 defeat with Luarca recording the lone Montreal goal, which eliminated Montreal from playoffs by a score of 3-2 on goals on aggregate.

In 2012, Yacine Ait-Slimane, Jérémy Gagnon-Laparé, and Stefan Vukovic were some of the notable alumni that played with Montreal. During the season Montreal achieved a nine-game undefeated streak, and recorded a franchise milestone by finishing as runners up in the standings with the second best offensive and third best defensive record. In the first round of the playoffs the team faced TFC Academy, and secured a 2-0 victory with both goals coming from Ilcu. In the next round the Impact faced the York Region Shooters, and advanced to the CSL Championship finals by defeating York Region by a score of 3-1 with Lefevre, and Ait-Slimane contributing the goals. Their opponents in the finals were Toronto Croatia, but unfortunately Montreal fell short by a 1-0 defeat. At the CSL awards ceremony Tissot received the CSL Defender of the Year award.

In 2013, head coach Eullaffroy was promoted to the senior team as an assistant coach. After the De-sanctioning  of the CSL by the CSA the club left the league. In 2013-14 the U-17/18 team played in the U.S. Soccer Development Academy. In 2014, the Academy joined the USL Premier Development League.

Staff

Year-by-year

Outdoor team

U17/18 team

U23 Team

Stadium
The Academy currently plays its home games at Saputo Stadium, a soccer-specific stadium which opened in May 2008.  As the name suggests, the stadium was funded privately (mainly by the Saputo family). Seating 20,341 supporters, Saputo Stadium is located just east of Olympic Stadium in the city's east end. Currently the seating is restricted just to the north grand stand.
CS St Jean De Vianney (2012-)

Notable players 

Canada 
 Yacine Ait-Slimane 
 Tarik Agday  
 Jason Beaulieu 
 Louis Béland-Goyette  
 Nazim Belguendouz  
 Janouk Charbonneau 
 Kevin Cossette  
 Maxime Crépeau 
 John Dinkota  
 Jérémy Gagnon-Laparé  
 Jems Geffrard  
 Chakib Hocine  
 Emad Houache  
 Anthony Jackson-Hamel  
 Charles Joly  
 Mastanabal Kacher  
 Frédéric Lajoie-Gravelle  
 Wandrille Lefèvre  
 Philippe Lincourt-Joseph  
 Kevin Luarca  
 Zakaria Messoudi  
 Aron Mkungilwa  
 Victor N'Diaye  
 Karl Ouimette  

 David Paulmin  
 Zachary Sukunda  
 Marco Terminesi  
 Maxim Tissot  
 Jonathan Vallée   
 Stefan Vukovic  
Belarus  
 Valentin Radevich 
Germany 
 Mélé Temguia 
Romania 
 Mircea Ilcu

References

External links
Official website
Impact Soccer fan site

Canadian Soccer League (1998–present) teams
Impact
CF Montréal
Canadian reserve soccer teams
2010 establishments in Quebec
Association football clubs established in 2010
Soccer clubs in Quebec